Isabel Beatriz "Bea" Paras de Leon (born August 2, 1996) is a Filipino professional volleyball player who currently plays for the club team Choco Mucho Flying Titans in the PVL. She played for the Ateneo Lady Eagles in the UAAP for five straight years and on her final year, led her team to its third championship and was named the UAAP Season 81 Finals MVP.

De Leon was selected to the 2015 Philippine Women's National Volleyball Team that represented the country during U23 and 2015 SEA Games.

Early life
Ever since she was young, Bea have played various sports like badminton, golf, softball, football and swimming. De Leon came from a family of Lasallians. Her Mother Det, Father Elmer and Brother Loel, even her aunts, uncles and cousins were all graduates of the most well known arch-rival of Ateneo, the De La Salle University. Her first choice for college was also La Salle but decided to go to Ateneo because her preferred course wasn't available that time in DLSU and she lives nearby. But what pushed her more to change her decision to switch schools was because she was persuaded by Ateneo superstars Alyssa Valdez and Denden Lazaro.

Education
She studied at St. Paul College, Pasig for grade school and Saint Pedro Poveda College for high school. She became the team captain for its high school girls' volleyball team. She also received the Athlete of the Year award for Volleyball during her graduation in Poveda.

BDL was a consistent Dean's lister in Ateneo and graduated with a degree in AB Management Economics. She is currently taking up Masters of Science in Sustainability Management at Ateneo Graduate Programs.

De Leon was a finalist for the Ambrosio Padilla Athlete of the Year Award. This award celebrate's one of Ateneo's most important ideals and is only given to those Atenean athletes who excels both in academics & sports.

Career
In her debut game in UAAP Season 77, De Leon was an immediate starter for the Ateneo Lady Eagles. The 5'11 middle blocker established herself as a threat in the middle for the defending champions with her powerful quick hits and blocks. She was a top contender for the Rookie of the Year Award averaging 9 pts per game, but in the mid-season, she injured her right index finger in training that caused her to be sidelined for 2 weeks and missed 3 games in the process. She returned in the last game of eliminations and helped her team go back to the finals scoring 11 pts. against their archrival, De La Salle Lady Spikers. They successfully defended their title against the Lady Spikers and sweep the season with a perfect 16–0 record.

On just her rookie year, Bea was chosen to be a part of the National Team that represented the country in the U-23 and 2015 Sea Games.

In the collegiate conference of Shakey's V-League Season 12, De Leon was awarded with the 2nd Best Middle Blocker Award.

In UAAP Season 78 and UAAP Season 79, the Lady Eagles were defeated by the Lady Spikers for 2 straight years in the finals and even lost Ateneo superstars Alyssa Valdez & Jia Morado simultaneously. Meanwhile, in UAAP Season 80, the Lady Eagles suffered a tremendous burden with the departure of their key players that led them to fail to enter the Finals for the 7th straight year after losing to the Lady Tamaraws  in the Final Four semifinals. Prior to this, De Leon had been very vocal that she was uncertain on going back to play her fifth and final year with the Lady Eagles after a disappointing ending season with 3 straight sets defeat against the Lady Tamaraws.

She signed with the Foton Tornadoes to start her Semi-pro volleyball career in the Philippine Superliga along with Jaja Santiago and Dindin Santiago.

After two months of discernment, De Leon decided to play her final season of eligibility in the UAAP, much to the delight of its new Head Coach Oliver Almadro who hails her return to Ateneo as a blessing and gave her the responsibility of Team Captain honors.

The Ateneo Lady Eagles decided to play in the 2018 PVL Open Conference instead on the Collegiate Conference wherein many Semi Pro and Pro teams are included which means Ateneo could have a harder time to get a win. But on just their first game, the Lady Eagles surprised everyone that they are no pushovers against a Myla Pablo led Pocari Sweat- Air Force team. They also managed to get a five set win against their former Queen Eagle Alyssa Valdez and former Head Coach Tai Bundit of Creamline Cool Smashers with De Leon scoring in double digits. They eventually met again in the Finals but the veteran laden team swept them in a best of three Finals series.

Many were hyped with the performance shown by the Lady Eagles in the PVL Open Conference. So people were disappointed after their shocking defeat in their opening game in UAAP Season 81 against the Lady Spikers. The Lady Eagles once again proved that their achievement was no fluke as they rampaged with a ten-game winning streak and became the top seeded team at the end of the eliminations. Blocking has been Ateneo's strength all throughout the season and it is because of their impeccable net defense led by the Ateneo's Big 3 also known as the Katipunan Triple Towers (De Leon, Madayag and Tolentino), they eventually won their third Championship against the gritty UST Lady Tigresses with De Leon being named as the Finals MVP.

On their transition to the Professional League, De Leon, alongside Madayag & Tolentino decided to play again together for the Choco Mucho Flying Titans in the PVL under their Ateneo Head Coach Oliver Almadro.

Clubs
  Foton Tornadoes (2018)
  Choco Mucho Flying Titans (2019)

Individual awards
SVL 2nd Best Middle Blocker 
UAAP Season 81 Finals MVP''
 Ambrosio Padilla Athlete of The Year Finalist (2018)

Collegiate
 2014 ASEAN University Games -  Bronze medal, with Ateneo Lady Eagles
2015 UAAP Season 77 -  Champion, with Ateneo Lady Eagles
2015 SVL 12th Season Collegiate Conference -  Silver medal, with Ateneo De Manila University Lady Eagles
2016 UAAP Season 78 -  Silver medal, with Ateneo Lady Eagles
 2016 ASEAN University Games -  Bronze medal, with Ateneo De Manila University Lady Eagles
 2016 SVL 13th Season Collegiate Conference –  Silver medal, with Ateneo De Manila University Lady Eagles
2017 UAAP Season 79 -  Silver medal, with Ateneo Lady Eagles
2018 UAAP Season 80 -  Bronze medal, with Ateneo Lady Eagles
2018 Premier Volleyball League Open Conference -  Silver medal, with Ateneo Motolite Lady Eagles
2019 UAAP Season 81 -  Champion, with Ateneo Lady Eagles

Philanthropy
Amidst the continued spread of the Coronavirus pandemic, Bea, along with her best friend Cel and other friends launched the "We Build as One" campaign to raise funds for emergency quarantine facilities and PPEs for various hospitals in the country. They were able to acquire a total of more than 1.3 million pesos.

De Leon also extended help to her fellow townmates in Marikina. She donated hundreds of boxes of relief goods from Rebisco as per Marikina Second District Representative Stella Quimbo.

On January 27, 2023 through a MOA signing, the "Bea de Leon Scholarship" was officially established in the Ateneo de Manila Loyola Schools. The first recipient of the said scholarship was Raphaella Ayen, who was also an avid fan of Bea because of her ability to excel on both academics & volleyball, her 'heartstrong' mantra and faith in God. Through Ayen's tweet, De Leon realized that this was the opportunity she was waiting for, and to finally give back to the community. Hence, the inception of the "Bea de Leon Scholarship" which aims to help those students who are academically qualified but in need of financial aid. Bea hopes that her example of generosity will be replicated in the future by other alumni whose successful professional career in sports was attained through an Ateneo Education.

References

Living people
Sportspeople from Manila
Ateneo de Manila University alumni
1996 births
University Athletic Association of the Philippines volleyball players
Philippines women's international volleyball players
Filipino women's volleyball players
Volleyball players from Metro Manila
Middle blockers